Lieutenant General Sir Gerald William Berragan,  (born 27 February 1958) is a former senior British Army officer who has served as Adjutant-General.

Career
Berragan was commissioned into the Royal Artillery in 1979. He served as Chief of Staff of 4th Armoured Brigade during the Gulf War before becoming Commanding Officer of 32 Regiment Royal Artillery in 1997 leading his regiment on operations in Northern Ireland and Kosovo and then becoming Colonel in the Headquarters of the Adjutant-General responsible for individual training policy in 1999. He was appointed Assistant Chief of Staff, Training at Land Command in May 2004 and then saw active service as Deputy Commanding General, Multi-National Corps – Iraq from January to October 2007. He went on to be Director of Recruiting and Training in December 2007, Director-General of Army Personnel in February 2011 and Adjutant-General in August 2012. Berragan retired from the army in 2015, and served as chief executive officer of the Institute for Apprenticeships and Technical Education.

Awards and honours
Berragan was appointed Knight Commander of the Order of the British Empire (KBE) in the 2015 New Year Honours.

References

|-

|-

|-
 

1958 births
Living people
British Army lieutenant generals
British Army personnel of the Gulf War
British Army personnel of the Iraq War
Companions of the Order of the Bath
Knights Commander of the Order of the British Empire
Royal Artillery officers